Bioccala is a genus of parasitic alveolates belonging to the phylum Apicomplexia.

Taxonomy 
This subgenus was raised to genus status by Landau et al. in 1984.

Hosts 

 Big brown bat (Eptesicus fuscus)
 Intermediate roundleaf bat (Hipposideros larvatus)

Distribution 

These parasites are found in Colombia and Thailand.

References 

Apicomplexa genera
Haemosporida

de:Plasmodiidae